is an annual festival celebrating Japanese American (JA) culture and history in Little Tokyo, Los Angeles. Nisei means 2nd generation in Japanese, describing the first American born Japanese, a group which the seven-day festival was originally meant to attract. Though named for the Nisei generation, Nisei Week is no longer targeted at Niseis, nor is the festival still contained within a week. Nisei Week Foundation president for 2006, Michelle Suzuki, described the festival as "the opportunity for people of all backgrounds to celebrate Japanese heritage and culture".

Festivities are held over one month, though the main attractions are held during the primary two weekends of the festival in mid-August. Nisei Week draws tens of thousands of participants each year from both the Japanese community and Southern California area, mostly to its Grand Parade and specialized festivals. The 80th Annual Nisei Week Festival & the Grand Parade were to take place in August 2020. The 12th Annual Tanabata Festival was to be held in Little Tokyo in mid-August 2020, but all of which were cancelled & deferred to 2022.

History and cultural analysis

Nisei Week's history began during the financially difficult era of the Great Depression — Issei, first generation Japanese immigrants, were growing too old and the Gentlemen's Agreement prohibited new Japanese immigration. The English speaking Nisei became a sought after potential revenue source to support Little Tokyo businesses dominated by Issei. With Little Tokyo falling into stagnation, Nisei week was a celebration intended to attract Niseis and to help generate more youthful exuberance in the district.

Mihiko Shimizu, original inventor of the festival, and other Issei business owners vied for an alliance with the Nisei run Japanese American Citizens League (JACL) to promote the festival. However, the possibility of being labelled as anti-American by anti-Japanese groups remained a concern, due to the collaboration of the two generations (American citizens and Japanese nationals) and cultural overtones of the festival. The Issei business owners decided to hand over all aspects of the celebration to the independent JACL to settle the problem. The first festival was held August 13, 1934, founded by the JACL.

Beyond economic reasons, Nisei Week was created to promote "ethnic solidarity". Utilizing Nisei Week's cultural environment, by centering it in the heart of Little Tokyo and holding cultural events, Issei hoped to bring Nisei back into the cultural fold of the older generation. Issei also hoped for Nisei to become brokers between Little Tokyo and the dominant society around it. The creation of the Nisei Week Queen, one year after the first Nisei Week in 1935, may be seen as the epitome of cultural mediation and broker between the Japanese community and white America. Mike Haigwara, Nisei Week's 2007 Street Arts and Carnival director, attributes Nisei Week with helping foster Japanese American identity and self-esteem.

Japanese internment presented another tumultuous and racially charged period for Nisei Week and the greater Japanese community. Executive Order 9066 was initiated in 1942, relocating and confining Japanese Americans to internment camps, including those running Nisei Week. The festival has been running continuously, except the years during and immediately after internment. Nisei Week celebrated its 50th anniversary in 1990, shifted from 6 years of inactivity during the WWII era. Despite obstacles, Nisei Week is the longest running Japanese festival in California, celebrating its 80th birthday in 2020.

Retrospectively, the celebration was seen by Time Magazine as dual reminder: "Unofficially, it recalls an ugly footnote to American history: the World War II evacuation and internment of more than 110,000 West Coast Japanese, most of them native-born U.S. citizens." Lon Kurashige, professor of ethnic studies at USC, proposes that the lingering effects of internment changed Nisei Week's cultural tones and affiliations, in part due to the weakening role of men during the internment period, which again shifted during and after the civil rights period.

Phillip Morris' first promotional event targeted at Asian and Pacific Islander American community events was staged at Nisei Week. The event was part of a larger "PULL strategy" program, which included marketing to increase brand recognition among Asians. A Marlboro booth provided samples and attempted to attract consumers by displaying a McLaren MP4/4 show car (Marlboro sponsored McLaren's F1 team at the time) at the 1988 Nisei Week festival.

In 1982, businesswoman Frances Hashimoto became the first woman to chair the Nisei Week festival.

"Aki the Akita", Nisei Week's official mascot, was created by renowned mascot artist Dick Sakahara in 1997 for Nisei Week's now defunct Dog Show . Aki appears as a costumed character to greet and entertain children, or in cartoon form as a symbol for the festival.

Nisei Week wasn't held between 1942 & 1945 nor 2020; the latter year saw a virtual festival.

Festivities 

Nisei Week has many attractions and exhibitions, which change annually, though many traditions remain each year.

Nisei Week Grand Parade
The Nisei Week Parade takes place on the primary Sunday of Nisei Week. The parade features many varied participants, mostly from Southern California and Japan, including the following: local high school marching bands, ondo dancing groups, martial art dojos, elected parade marshals (usually celebrities or community heroes), Japanese and local politicians (such as the Mayor of Los Angeles), a mikoshi shrine, floats, pageant queens, taiko players, etc. Spanning several hours, the Nisei Week Parade lasts long due to its many participants and slow walk pace of traditional Japanese dancers.

Aomori Nebuta, a famous festival within Japan, presented an imported parade float at the 2007 Grand Parade. The parade took place on August 19, at 6pm, in order for the float's lights to be visible after nightfall.

The 2011 parade on August 14 featured former Los Angeles Dodgers manager Tommy Lasorda as grand marshal. American figure skater Mirai Nagasu, American actress and singer Gina Hiraizumi, Japanese singer and TV personality Kenichi Mikawa have appeared in the parade.

Go For Broke and U.S. 100th Infantry Battalion Exhibits
After World War II, exhibits were introduced about internment camps and JA veterans, including those of the U.S. 100th Infantry Battalion. Currently, the Japanese American National Museum (JANM) and Go For Broke Monument have replaced separate exhibits and the old JANM building. JA veterans still march annually in the Nisei Week Parade.

Nisei Week Car Show
The Car Show was introduced in 2000 and is produced by Mainstream Productions LLC. / Showoff Car Show. The show features import cars, exhibits, import models, along with car competitions for cash and sponsor prizes. The Car Show is one of the few admission based events at Nisei Week, covering the cash prize and logistics of a full fledge festival, including live entertainment and exhibits. The import scene is argued as both influenced and originated within the Asian American community and linked to Asian American identity.

Nisei Week Queen and Court

The 2nd annual Nisei Week introduced the Nisei Week pageant and Nisei Week Coronation Ball in 1935. The pageant was created to help reinvigorate local business and promote goodwill in the greater Los Angeles community. Today, the queen is crowned for her community service and presentation skills, with a formal coronation held for judging and celebration. New queens and princesses (part of a court marked by year) are inducted annually and featured prominently on float during the Nisei Week Parade. The Queen and Court, representing Nisei Week during community events throughout the year, were crowned at a formal dinner of 700 guests on the primary weekend of Nisei Week's festival.
 2021 Queen & Court – Queen Jaime Sunny Hasama, 1st Princess Brianne Mari Yasukochi, Miss Tomodachi Kiyomi Arimitsu Takemoto, Princess Kendra Alana Motoyasu, Princess Michelle Toshiko Murakami, Princess Kiyoko Alicia Nakatsui
 2020– NONE (cancelled by COVID-19 pandemic)
 2019
 2018
 2017
 2016 Queen and Court – Queen Jaclyn Hidemi Tomita, 1st Princess Megan Tomiko Ono, Miss Tomodachi Julie Kiyomi Tani, Princess Heather Yoneko Iwata, Princess Kaya Minezaki, Princess April Leilani Nishinaka, and Princess Shannon Aiko Rose Tsumaki
 2015 Queen and Court – Queen Sara Kuniko Hutter, 1st Princess Veronica Toyomi Ota, Miss Tomodachi Karen Nana Mizoguchi, Princess Michelle Kaori Hanabusa, Princess Kelsey Nakaji Kwong, Princess Camryn Michiko Rie Sugita, Princess Tamara Mieko Teragawa
 2014 Queen and Court – Queen Tori Angela Nishinaka-Leon, 1st Princess Lindsey Sugimoto, Miss Tomodachi Ashley Akemi Arikawa, Princess Tiffany Akemi Hashimoto, Princess Melissa Sayuri Kozono, Princess Dominique Ariadne Mashburn
 2013 Queen and Court – Queen Lauren Naomi Iwata, First Princess Ashley Mieko Honma, Miss Tomadachi Megumi Yuhara, Princess Stephanie Megumi Fukunaga, Princess Laura Akemi Higashi, and Princess Jamie Tomiko Teragawa
 2012 Queen and Court – Queen Emily Folick, Crystal Hanano (First Princess), Kaitlynn Sakurai (Miss Tomodachi), Lauren Tanaka Arii, Marci Asao, Erika Fisher, and Sarah Fujimoto
 2011 Queen and Court — Queen Erika Olsen, First Princess Mimi Yang, Miss Tomodachi Kay Yamaguchi and Princesses Jessica Kanai, Melissa Nishimura, Amber Piatt, Leann Fujimani, and Michi Lew
 2010 Queen and Court — Queen Lani Kume Nishiyama, First Princess Kelli Toshiye Teragawa, Miss Tomodachi Jamie Joyce Hagiyaas,  Princess Brynn Nakamoto, Princess Christy Sakamoto, Princess Lauren Terumi Weber, and Princess Erin Reiko Yokomizo
2009 Queen and Court — Queen Dana Heatherton, First Princess Marisa Tamaru, Princess Jennifer Akamine, Princess Michelle Hirose, Princess Whitney Itano, Princess Aimee Machida, and Miss Tomodachi Nicole Masuda
 2008 Queen and Court — Queen Jill Kaori Hiraizumi, First Princess Kimberly Midori Kitaura, Princess Lisa Takehana, Princess Marissa Asako Ishii, Princess Kie Flora Ito, Miss Tomodachi Lindy Sumiko Fujimoto
 2007 — Queen Monika Taniguchi Teuffel
 2006 — Queen Liane Takano
 2005 — Queen Steffanie Tamehiro
 2004 — Queen Nikki Kodama
 2003 — Queen Nicole Miyako Cherry
 2002 — Queen Jamie Mizuhara
 2001 — Queen Lauren Hanako Kinkade
 2000 — Queen Tricia Tanaka

Pageant controversy
The pageant has not been without controversy. Originally the queen was selected through ballots given after purchases in Little Tokyo, allowing those making many purchases to vote many times; the rule was changed to allow a fairer chance for all contestants. One controversy remains within the JA community: mixed-race contestants. Competitors must be of at least 50% Japanese ancestry. Due to the increased outmarriage ratio of Japanese Americans, multi-racial (also known as hapa in the Japanese community) contestants began to appear more frequently, causing questioning about the Japanese cultural spirit of the competition and competing beauty standards of whites versus Asians.

Lon Kurashige, professor of ethnic studies at USC, argues that Nisei Queens played a subordinate role to as ambassadors to Issei, Nisei and white Americans. The Queens were viewed as bi-cultural, possessing "quiet charm" and "lively personality", attributed to Japanese and white Americans respectively. Criticism of sexism was brought forth by the Women's Concerns Committee within the JACL. The typical beauty portion of pageants, such as swimsuit competition, were eliminated from the Queen coronation.
–

Nisei Week Street Arts Fair and Carnival
Originally similar to a matsuri (Japanese style festival) or carnival, a street festival was held over the weekend, featuring games, crafts, and rides for children, along with food and arts vendors. Street Arts was created in addition to the carnival to feature Southern California crafts and food vendors. The old style carnival was largely removed by 2000's festival year. Street Arts and the carnival were always open to the public, with no admission fee.

The 2006 fair included an eating contest of dumplings (gyoza). World champion eaters Sonya Thomas and Joey Chestnut competed in the International Federation of Competitive Eating sanctioned event, with both competitors eating over 200 dumplings.

Old School Carnival Return
Mike Hagiwara, a Nisei Week committee member, announced the return of the "old school" Nisei Week carnival for 2007's festivities, under his direction. His press release, circulating by email and JA news, describes the nostalgia and eventual dwindling of the carnival. The carnival goals include creating long lasting and enjoyable memories to a new generation, along with helping the older generation relive memories of Nisei Week's past. The carnival also plans to avoid commercialization, using community groups to populate the vending and game booths. Hagiwara believes the carnival will help foster Japanese American identity, giving JAs a medium to feel better about themselves and their heritage.

JSN Matsuri
Partnering with the Japanese Student Network (JSN), Nisei Week's 66th annual celebration included a Japanese style carnival thrown by JSN.

Tofu Festival

In coordination with the Little Tokyo Service Center, Tofu Fest was added as a subcommittee to Nisei Week in 1996, focusing on Japanese cuisine and obon like atmosphere. As its name suggests, tofu was the primary ingredient of dishes and the cultural icon of the festival.  The Tofu Festival was discontinued after 2007.

Nikkei Games
The Nikkei Games offers competition and activities for Japanese American sports leagues, and open events such as running for children. It also features martial art competitions and exhibitions. Nisei Week supports the JA community through Nikkei Games, as Japanese American sports leagues remain an important part of JA culture and history (see also: Nikkei sports).

Little Tokyo Anime Festival
The Little Tokyo Anime Festival features video gaming, manga, martial arts, anime, cosplaying, and other Japanese popular culture exports, as part of booths and exhibits. A cosplay contest is held, where arbitrated best costume winners are presented. Cosplayers also take part in the Nisei Week parade. The 2007 cosplay contest was held on August 19, inside the Little Tokyo Shopping Center.

Hundreds of cosplayers participated in the annual Nisei Week parade. They stopped at Second Street and San Pedro Street for a large group picture.

Nisei Week Fashion Show
The Nisei Week Fashion Show showcases fashion and provides entertainment acts. The Nisei Week court usually does an opening number to commence the event (e.g., a choreographed dance).  Other Japanese-American models, often past Nisei Week court members, walk the runway to represent the clothing lines.

Nisei Week Baby Pageant
Stemming from the queen pageant, the Baby Pageant allows for parents to showcase new born members of the community and provide an event for parent networking.

Tanabata Festival

The annual Los Angeles Tanabata Festival was started in 2009 during Nisei Week by the Little Tokyo Public Safety Association. Various community groups participate with colorful handmade paper ornament streamers called kazari, which literally means decoration in Japanese. Many performers (for example, Japanese performance artist Miyuki Matsunaga with her Geta Dance Art) appear on the main stage. The 12th annual festival will take place in mid-August 2022 at the JANM Plaza in Little Tokyo as the festival went on hiatus in 2020-21.

Gyoza Eating Championship
The Day-Lee Foods World Gyoza Eating Championship, which has been an annual event since 2008 after being held in 2006, has become a major event on the Major League Eating calendar.  The event attracts top stars on the competitive eating circuit, with Joey Chestnut and Matt Stonie winning the past few years.  Other notable stars who have competed include Miki Sudo, Eric "Badlands" Booker, and Geoffrey Esper.

Ondo dancing and closing
In tradition of Japanese matsuris, traditional ondo dances are conducted in a closing celebration of Nisei Week's events. Madame Fujima Kansuma was 2006's official choreographer, where her and fellow instructors held chochin lanterns marked with the names of deceased instructors of the past. Public participation is encouraged, with formal dance troupes, Nisei Week Queen and Court, families, and community groups joining in for the dances.

Official passing of Nisei Week Foundation office positions to a new cabinet also takes place during closing speeches.

See also
 History of the Japanese in Los Angeles
 Japanese American
 Japanese American Citizens League
 Japanese American National Museum
 Japanese diaspora
 Little Tokyo
 Matsuri
 Obon
 Tofu Festival

References

External links

 Nisei Week's official website
 Japanese-City.com | Nisei Week Festival Tips, Little Tokyo
 Older Nisei Week site, with scanned flyers and documents
 Tofu Festival's official website
 Nisei Week's Car Show official website
 Nikkei Games official website
 JACL's official website
 Little Tokyo Anime Festival's Myspace.com page
 Los Angeles Tanabata Festival's official website

Festivals in Los Angeles
Japanese-American history
Japanese-American culture in Los Angeles
Little Tokyo, Los Angeles